Peter Leboutillier (born January 11, 1975) is a Canadian former professional ice hockey player who played 35 games in the National Hockey League for the Mighty Ducks of Anaheim. 'Pete' played for the Western Hockey League for the Red Deer Rebels, where he was captain in 1994–95.  He also played in the American Hockey League for the Baltimore Bandits, Cincinnati Mighty Ducks and the Lowell Lock Monsters.  He also had a spell in England for the Sheffield Steelers before retiring due to knee injury. Now, he is the Director of Player Development for Team Maryland AAA Hockey and Assistant Coach for the Maryland Black Bears (NAHL)

Leboutillier's career is profiled in the book, "Journeymen: 24 Bittersweet Tales of Short Major League Sports Careers."

Career statistics

External links

1975 births
Baltimore Bandits players
Brandon Wheat Kings players
Canadian ice hockey right wingers
Cincinnati Mighty Ducks players
Ice hockey people from Manitoba
Living people
Lowell Lock Monsters players
Anaheim Ducks draft picks
Mighty Ducks of Anaheim players
Neepawa Natives players
New York Islanders draft picks
New York Islanders players
Red Deer Rebels players
Sheffield Steelers players
People from Minnedosa, Manitoba
Franco-Manitoban people
Canadian expatriate ice hockey players in England